The 2016 Auburn Tigers softball team is an American softball team, representing Auburn University for the 2016 NCAA softball season. The Auburn Tigers play their home games at Jane B. Moore Field.

In 2015, the Auburn Tigers softball team went 56-11 during Clint Myers second season, and won its first SEC softball tournament on May 9, 2015, at Tiger Park in Baton Rouge, LA, by defeating #11 Tennessee in extra innings. Auburn garnered a #4 seed in the 2015 NCAA Division I softball tournament, and hosted a regional and super regional at Jane B. Moore Field in Auburn, AL.  Auburn won both the regional and super regional and advanced to their first 2015 Women's College World Series at the ASA Hall of Fame Stadium in Oklahoma City, OK.  They made it to the Finals of the tournament, where they lost to eventual champion Florida by two runs.

In the 2016 preseason fall exhibition games the Tigers were 8-0, only surrendering 3 runs.

In December 2015, Jane B. Moore Field began an 821-seat expansion along with more rest rooms, and will reconfigure the front of the stadium to add a grassy area for fans and kids before the first game.

The Tigers 2016 regular season began on February 11 at home against Appalachian State.  SEC Play began on March 12, when the Tigers hosted the #1 Florida Gators.

Auburn finished the regular season in a tie for 3rd place within the conference, and received the 4th seed in the 2016 SEC softball tournament. Beating #5 Alabama and #1 Florida, they made it to their second SEC Championship Final in a row on May 14, 2016, held at Nusz Park in Starkville, MS, and defeated #14 LSU 7-1 to collect back-to-back SEC Championships in Softball.

Auburn garnered a #4 seed for the second year in a row in the 2016 NCAA Division I softball tournament, and hosted a regional and super regional at Jane B. Moore Field in Auburn, AL. Auburn won both the regional and super regional and advanced to the second NCAA Women's College World Series at the ASA Hall of Fame Stadium in Oklahoma City, OK, in as many years.

Roster

Schedule
Official Schedule - LINK

 Game 1 of the series at Tennessee was postponed from April 30 from May 1 due to rain.  The game was begun at 7:15 PM on April 30 on ESPN2, but was postponed in the bottom of the 1st inning with Auburn leading 1-0.
 The SEC Tournament Quarterfinals game against Alabama was originally scheduled for May 12 at 6:30 PM on the SEC Network, but rain in the previous game postponed it to the following morning at 11:00 AM on ESPNU.
 The NCAA Softball Regional game against Jacksonville State was moved up to 2:00 PM from 6:00 PM later that night due to a threat of severe weather.
 The Women's College World Series game against Georgia was originally intended to be played on June 3 at 6:00 PM.  Due to rain on June 2, two games that night had to be postponed and were made up on June 3 beginning at 6:00 PM, therefore forcing the Auburn-Georgia game to be postponed to the following night.

Ranking movement

References

Auburn
Auburn Tigers softball seasons
Auburn
Women's College World Series seasons